Luis Guillermo Berrío Gómez (11 April 1968 – 11 April 2021) was a Colombian football player and coach.

Playing career
Born in Amagá, Berrío began his career in 1988, playing for Envigado, Atlético Huila, Deportivo Pereira and Deportes Quindío, and winning four promotions throughout his career. He also played in Peru for Unión Minas and Juan Aurich. He retired in 2004, whilst a Deportivo Pereira player.

Coaching career
Berrío coached more than 300 games, for clubs including Atlético Huila, Independiente Medellín, Alianza Petrolera and Deportivo Pasto.

Later life and death
Berrío died of a heart attack on his 53rd birthday.

References

External links
 

1968 births
2021 deaths
Sportspeople from Antioquia Department
Colombian footballers
Association football midfielders
Envigado F.C. players
Atlético Huila footballers
Deportivo Pereira footballers
Deportes Quindío footballers
Unión Minas footballers
Juan Aurich footballers
Colombian expatriate footballers
Colombian expatriates in Peru
Expatriate footballers in Peru
Colombian football managers
Atlético Huila managers
Independiente Medellín managers
Alianza Petrolera F.C. managers
Deportivo Pasto managers